Carn Towan is a coastal hamlet northeast of Sennen Cove in west Cornwall, England, UK.  Carn Towan is in the civil parish of Sennen.

References

Hamlets in Cornwall
Sennen